The Plymouth and West Devon Football League, or just the PWD or P&D, is a football competition based in Devon, England. The league's top division, the Premier Division, sits at level 12 of the English football league system. This top division is a direct feeder to the Devon League South & West.

The league currently has two Saturday divisions – Premier Division and Division One – along with five Sunday divisions.

History
In Plymouth, between World War One and Two there was a United Churches League – which was the origin of the Plymouth Combination League. This league later amalgamated with the Plymouth and District League to become the Plymouth and District Combination League, and then in 2004 the league in its current format was formed, with the amalgamation of Plymouth's two Sunday leagues, the West Devon Sunday Football League and the Plymouth Sunday Football League, to become the Plymouth and West Devon Combination Football League. It is thus one of the few leagues in England to administer both Saturday and Sunday competitions. Because of this, many clubs have both Saturday and Sunday teams under the same name and the league allows players to register for both Saturday and Sunday teams.

Since 1904 a youth league, the Devon Junior and Minor League, has existed as a platform for teams with age ranges of U9s to U18s in Plymouth, South West Devon and East Cornwall. Numerous clubs in the PWD have youth teams in the DJM, although this is more common with fully fledged sports clubs, and less common with 'pub teams'.

2022–23 Saturday Member Clubs

Premier Division
Hooe Rovers
Mainstone Social
Millbridge
Mount Wise
Plymouth Hope
Plymouth Marjon Development
Plymouth Phoenix
Plymouth Vaults
Signal Box Oak Villa

Division One
Central Park Rangers
DC Auto Repairs Reserves
FC Tavyside
Horrabridge Rangers
Horrabridge Rangers Reserves
Hunter District
Lugger Devonport
Millbridge Reserves
Plympton Athletic Reserves
Princetown
St Johnstone FC Social
Tamar View
Tamar View Reserves
Torpoint Athletic 4ths

2022–23 Sunday Member Clubs

Premier Division
Elburton Villa
Lakeside Athletic
Queen and Constitution
Signal Box Oak Villa
South Brent
Stoke United
Tamar View
Tirio

Division One
Horrabridge Rangers
PDM
Phil's Fellas
Plymouth Marjon
Plymouth United
Porto Plymouth
Seymour Arms
University of St Mark & St John

Division Two
Inter Plymouth
Plymouth Rangers
Plympton Athletic
Staddy
Tamar View Reserves
Tamerton Foliot
Team Carpy
The Anchorage

Division Three
Abbots Way
Admiral MacBride
Plymouth Hope
Staddy Reserves
Stoke Bar & Grill
Tamar View 3rds
Tamerton Foliot Reserves
The Anchorage Reserves

Division Four
Castle Loyale
Central Park Rangers
Cherry Tree
Devonport Parkway
Hunter District
Moorview Cherries
Plympton Athletic Reserves
Saltram Athletic
Tavistock Wanderers

Previous League Champions

The divisions were renamed ahead of the 2009–10 season.

The divisions were again renamed ahead of the 2014–15 season. Sunday records are incomplete prior to the 2016–17 season.

The Sunday divisions were renamed to match the Saturday divisions ahead of the 2018–19 season.

Cup Competitions
The Premier Cup (all Saturday teams)
The Challenge Bowl (only Saturday division one teams)
The Ken Rickard League Cup (all Sunday teams)
The Sunday League Challenge Cup (only Sunday division one teams)
The Brian Ayres Saturday Plate (for teams eliminated from the Premier Cup in the first round)
The Brian Ayres Sunday Plate (for teams eliminated from the Ken Rickard League Cup in the first round)

See also
Devon Football League
Duchy League
East Cornwall League
South Devon Football League
South West Peninsula League

References

External links
football.mitoo.co  
FA site
History of Devon FA

Football leagues in England
Football in Devon